Alfred Percival Maudslay FRAI (18 March 1850 – 22 January 1931) was a British diplomat, explorer, and archaeologist. He was one of the first Europeans to study Maya ruins. He also fully translated and annotated the best version of Bernal Díaz del Castillo's Historia verdadera de la conquista de la Nueva España from the only original manuscript in 1908 for the Hakluyt Society, which was abridged in 1928.

Early life
Maudslay was born at Lower Norwood Lodge, near London, England, into a wealthy engineering family descended from Henry Maudslay. He was educated at Royal Tunbridge Wells and Harrow School, and studied natural sciences at Trinity Hall, Cambridge, in 1868–72, where he was acquainted with John Willis Clark, then Secretary of the Cambridge Antiquarian Society. After graduation, Maudslay enrolled in medical school but left because of acute bronchitis.

Career
After leaving Medical School, he moved to Trinidad, becoming private secretary to Governor William Cairns, and transferred with Cairns to Queensland. He subsequently moved to Fiji to work with Sir Arthur Gordon, its governor, and helped campaign against rebellious local tribes. Later he served as British consul in Tonga and Samoa. In February 1880, Maudslay resigned from the colonial service to pursue his own interests, having spent six years in the British Pacific colonies. He then joined his siblings in Calcutta during their round-the-world trip, returned to Britain in December, and then set out for Guatemala via British Honduras.

In Guatemala, Maudslay began the major archaeological work for which he is now best remembered. He started at the Maya ruins of Quirigua and Copan where, with the help of Frank Sarg, he hired labourers to help clear and survey the remaining structures and artefacts. Sarg also introduced Maudslay to the newly found ruins in Tikal and to reliable guide Gorgonio López. Maudslay was the first to describe the site of Yaxchilán. With Teobert Maler, Alfred Maudslay explored Chichén in the 1880s and both spent several weeks at the site and took extensive photographs. Maudslay published the first long-form description of Chichen Itza in his book, "Biologia Centrali-Americana".

In the course of his surveys, Maudslay pioneered many of the later archaeological techniques. He hired Italian expert Lorenzo Giuntini and technicians to make plaster casts of the carvings, while Gorgonio López made casts of papier-mâché. Artist Annie Hunter drew impressions of the casts before they were shipped to museums in England and the United States. Maudslay also took numerous detailed photographs – dry plate photography was then a new technique – and made copies of the inscriptions.

All told, Maudslay made a total of six expeditions to Maya ruins. After 13 years of preparation, he published his findings in 1902 as a 5-volume compendium entitled Biologia Centrali-Americana, which contained numerous excellent drawings and photographs of Maya ruins, Maudslay's commentary, and an appendix on archaic calendars by Joseph Thompson Goodman.

Maudslay also applied for permission to make a survey of Monte Albán in Oaxaca but when he finally received permission in 1902, he could no longer finance the work with his own money. The firm of Maudslay, Sons and Field had gone bankrupt and reduced Maudslay's income. He unsuccessfully applied for funding from the Carnegie Institution. The Maudslays moved to San Ángel near Mexico City for two years.

In 1905, Maudslay began to translate the memoirs of Bernal Díaz del Castillo, who had been a soldier in the troops of the conquistadors; he completed it in 1912. In 1907 the Maudslays moved permanently back to Britain. Maudslay become a President of the Royal Anthropological Institute 1911–12. He also chaired the 18th International Congress of Americanists in London in 1912.

Personal life
In 1892, Maudslay married US-born Anne Cary Morris, a granddaughter of Gouverneur Morris. For their honeymoon, the couple sailed to Guatemala via New York and San Francisco. There the Maudslays worked for two weeks on behalf of the Peabody Museum of Harvard University. Their account was published in 1899 as A Glimpse at Guatemala.  Annie Maudslay died in 1926. In 1928, Maudslay married widow Alice Purdon. In the following years he finished his memoirs, Life in the Pacific Fifty Years Ago.

Alfred Maudslay died January 1931 in Hereford, England. He was buried in the crypt of Hereford Cathedral next to his first wife. Materials he collected are currently stored at Harvard and the British Museum.

Selected works
 Historia verdadera de la conquista de la Nueva España (The True History of the Conquest of New Spain) by Captain Bernal Díaz del Castillo. London 1908 Hakluyt Society (4 Volumes, 214 chapters with Appendices) from the only original copy published by Genaro García in Mexico in 1904 with notes and appendices – considered the most complete and authentic translation Volume 1, Volumes 2,and 3, Volume 4, and Volume 5 abridged in 1928 as The Discovery and the Conquest of Mexico 1517-21
 Archaeology. 1850–1931. (followed by the Atlas edited by F. Ducane Godman and Osbert Salvin; or, Contributions to the knowledge of the fauna and flora of Mexico of Central America. (Reprint 1974)
  Biologia Centrali-Americana: Contributions to the Knowledge of the Fauna and Flora of Mexico and Central America (reprint), University of Oklahoma Press, 1983. .
 Anne Cary Morris Maudslay and Alfred Percival Maudslay, A Glimpse at Guatemala, and Some Notes on the Ancient Monuments of Central America, London, John Murray, 1899. (Reissued by Cambridge University Press, 2010. )
 Life in the Pacific Fifty Years Ago, London: George Routledge & Sons, 1930.

References

 Ian Graham,Alfred Maudslay and the Maya: A Biography, University of Oklahoma Press, 2002. .
 Alfred M. Tozzer, "Alfred Percival Maudslay" (obituary), American Anthropologist, New Series, Vol. 33, No. 3 (Jul. – Sep. 1931), pp. 403–412.
 T. A. Joyce, "Alfred Percival Maudslay" (obituary), Man, Vol. 32, May 1932 (May 1932), pp. 123–125.
 A glimpse at Guatemala, and some notes on the ancient monuments of Central America, 1899

External links
 
 

English archaeologists
English explorers
Photographers from London
Mayanists
Mesoamerican archaeologists
British Mesoamericanists
19th-century Mesoamericanists
20th-century Mesoamericanists
1850 births
1931 deaths
People educated at Harrow School
Alumni of Trinity Hall, Cambridge
British expatriates in Trinidad and Tobago
British expatriates in Australia
British expatriates in Fiji
British expatriates in Tonga
British expatriates in Samoa
British expatriates in Guatemala
19th-century English photographers
Fellows of the Royal Anthropological Institute of Great Britain and Ireland
Presidents of the Royal Anthropological Institute of Great Britain and Ireland